Arpa Darrehsi (also Romanized as Ārpā Darrehsī and Ārpā Darehsī; also known as Ārpā Darasī, Ārpā Darast, Ārpādarrasi, Ārpā Darreh, Ārpā Darst, Arpadar’ya, and Ārpeh Darreh) is a village in Meydan Chay Rural District, in the Central District of Tabriz County, East Azerbaijan Province, Iran. At the 2006 census, its population was 793, in 220 families.

References 

Populated places in Tabriz County